William E. Lehman (1874–1951) was an architect based in New Jersey. He designed numerous theaters. He designed Proctor's Palace in Yonkers, New York. His firm was founded in 1896. His firm was in Newark. He graduated from the Cornell University School of Architecture in 1895. His brother David J. Lehman joined the firm in 1912. The firm is responsible for public buildings and private residences in New Jersey and other Eastern states.

Works
Theaters credited to Lehman include:
 Adams Theatre at 28 Branford Place in Newark 
 Kingston Theatre at 323 Wall Street in Kingston, New York (still in use)  
 Brook Arts Center at 10 Hamilton Street in Bound Brook, New Jersey (still in use)
 Count Basie Theatre at 99-101 Monmouth Street in Red Bank, New Jersey (still in use)
 Maplewood Theatre at 155 Maplewood Avenue in Maplewood, New Jersey (still in use) 
 Loew's Melba Theatre at 300 Livingston Street in Brooklyn, New York 
 Oritani Theatre at 300 Main Street in Hackensack, New Jersey 
 Proctor's Palace at 53 S. Broadway in Yonkers, New York 
 Roosevelt Theatre at 714 Summit Avenue in Union City, New Jersey 
 Sanford Theater at 1269 Springfield Avenue in Irvington, New Jeresy

References

Further reading
William E. Lehman American Institute of Architects

1874 births
1951 deaths
Cornell University College of Architecture, Art, and Planning alumni
Architects from New Jersey
American theatre architects